Cremer is an occupational surname with the same origin as the name Kramer. Notable people with the surname include:

 Bruno Cremer (1929–2010), French actor
Camille Crémer (1840–1876), French general
 Christoph Cremer (born 1944), German physicist
 Cristina Cremer de Busti (born 1952), Argentine politician
 Erika Cremer (1900–1996), German physical chemist
 Esther Cremer (born 1988), German middle-distance runner
 Fritz Cremer (1906–1993), German sculptor
 Gerard de Cremere (1512–1594), Flemish cartographer
 Graeme Cremer (born 1986), Zimbabwean cricketer
 Grant Cremer (born 1978), Australian middle-distance runner
 Hermann Cremer (1834–1903), German theologian 
 Jacob Jan Cremer (1827–1880), Dutch writer and painter
 Jacob Theodoor Cremer (1847–1923), Dutch businessman and politician 
 Jan Cremer (born 1940), Dutch author
 Melanie Cremer (born 1970), German field hockey player
 Peter-Erich Cremer, (1911–1992), German U-boat Captain
 R. W. Ketton-Cremer (1906–1969), English biographer and historian
 Ted Cremer (1919–1980), American football player
 Thomas Cremer (born 1945), German German geneticist and molecular biologist
 Victoriano Crémer (1906–2009), Spanish poet and journalist
 William Randal Cremer (1828–1908), English Member of Parliament and pacifist
Cremers
 Armin B. Cremers (born 1946), German mathematician and computer scientist
 Cas Cremers (born 1974), Dutch computer scientist
 Coos Cremers (1806–1882), Dutch politician
 Eppo Cremers (1823–1896), Dutch Minister of Foreign Affairs and Speaker of the House
 Jan Cremers (born 1952), Dutch politician and sociologist
 Ruud Cremers (born 1992), Dutch cyclist
 Vittoria Cremers (1859–?), Italian Theosophist
De Cremer
 David De Cremer (born 1972), Belgian psychologist

See also 
 Cremer & Wolffenstein, architecture firm
 Kramer (surname)